Howard Richard Plumb (28 August 1971 – 7 July 2014) was a British windsurfer. He competed in the Mistral One Design at the 1996 Summer Olympics.  

Outside his sport, Plumb graduated with a degree in mechanical engineering from Portsmouth University and was employed in the biotechnology industry until his death.

On 5 July 2014, Plumb sustained head injuries after colliding with a car whilst he was cycling in Knight's Hill, Charlton. Plumb was airlifted to London's St George's Hospital in Tooting; however he later died on 7 July 2014 as the result of the injuries sustained. The driver of the car which struck Plumb later pled guilty to a charge of causing death by careless driving.

References

External links
 
 

1971 births
2014 deaths
English windsurfers
English male sailors (sport)
Olympic sailors of Great Britain
Sailors at the 1996 Summer Olympics – Mistral One Design
Sportspeople from Chichester
Road incident deaths in London